Lukyanivka may refer to:
 Lukyanivska Prison, a well-known prison in Kyiv;
 Lukyanivka, a neighborhood in Kyiv.

See also

Lukianivska (disambiguation)